The 2016–17 Saint Louis Billikens men's basketball team represented Saint Louis University in the 2016–17 NCAA Division I men's basketball season. The Billikens were led by first-year head coach Travis Ford. The team played their home games at Chaifetz Arena as a member of the Atlantic 10 Conference. They finished the season 12–21, 6–12 in A-10 play to finish in 11th place. They received the No. 11 seed in the A-10 tournament where they defeated Duquesne in the first round to advance to the second round where they lost to George Washington.

Previous season 
The Billikens finished the 2015–16 season with a record of 11–22, 5–13 in A-10 play to finish in a tie for 12th place. They defeated George Mason in the first round of the A-10 tournament to advance to the second round where they lost to George Washington.

On March 10, 2016, head coach Jim Crews was released from his coaching duties by the school. On March 30, the school hired Travis Ford as head coach.

Preseason 
The Billikens were picked to finish in last place in the A-10 Preseason Poll.

Departures

Incoming transfers

Incoming Recruits

Roster

Schedule and Results

|-
!colspan=9 style=| Exhibition

|-
!colspan=9 style=| Regular season

|-
!colspan=9 style=| Atlantic 10 tournament

References

Saint Louis
Saint Louis Billikens men's basketball seasons
Saint
Saint